According to Mrs. Hoyle is a 1951 American crime film directed by Jean Yarbrough and written by Scott Darling and Barney Gerard. The film stars Spring Byington, Anthony Caruso, Tanis Chandler, Brett King, Stephen Chase and Robert Karnes. The film was released on May 20, 1951, by Monogram Pictures.

Plot
Retired schoolteacher Mrs. Hoyle (Spring Byington), recognized for her reformation of young men, has resided at a second-rate hotel for twenty-five years, when gang leader Morganti (Anthony Caruso) buys the hotel. Morganti, who has decided that he and his men will reform, evicts many residents; however, Mrs. Hoyle convinces him to allow her and dance hall girl Angela Brown (Tanis Chandler) to remain. Eddie Slattery (Brett King), one of Morganti's henchmen, falls in love with Angela and recognizes Mrs. Hoyle as his long-lost mother, but does not disclose his knowledge. Mrs. Hoyle does not recognize Eddie because she has not seen her son since her husband James, whom she thinks was a traveling salesman, mysteriously left her years earlier, taking their young son with him. At first, members of Morganti's gang are reluctant to adapt to their leader's change of heart; however, under Mrs. Hoyle's influence, all the men abandon their evil ways except for Harry Rogan (Robert Karnes). Defying Morganti's orders, Rogan plans a payroll robbery of a local grocery store the same night as the new hotel restaurant is holding its grand opening and tries to enlist Eddie to be his accomplice. Although Eddie at first refuses to participate because of his interest in Angela and Mrs. Hoyle, he finally relents when he is reminded that Rogan saved his life in a previous holdup. After the robbery, Eddie wants nothing to do with the stolen money and refuses to let Rogan tell him where he has hidden the money. Unknown to all, Rogan has hidden it inside a fur coat hanging in Mrs. Hoyle's closet. With the help of the grocery store's night watchman, who identifies Rogan, a known member of Morganti's gang, from a mug shot, police detective Pat Dennison (Tris Coffin) goes to the hotel and accuses Morganti of being behind the robbery. When Eddie sees the watchman with Dennison, he tells Rogan and the two try to escape. As the police chase after them, Rogan is shot and killed and Eddie is knocked unconscious when he falls on the pavement. Mrs. Hoyle is arrested after the money and a trinket box containing several valuable jewels are found in her room. She denies knowledge of the money and claims the jewels were inexpensive presents from her husband. Morganti pays for Mrs. Hoyle's bail, and not even Dennison believes that she has had anything to do with a robbery, but the prosecuting attorney (James Flavin) insists on trying her. The trial opens while Eddie is still in a coma. During Mrs. Hoyle's testimony, the prosecuting attorney confronts her with the fact that the "trinkets" in her possession are valuable jewels and reveals that her husband was a convicted jewel thief who died in prison eight years before. Mrs. Hoyle is shattered by the revelation and feels faint, prompting the sympathetic Judge Guthrie to call a recess and announce to the court that his friendship of many years with Mrs. Hoyle may require him to recuse himself from the case. During the recess, Eddie regains consciousness and learns of the charges against Mrs. Hoyle. Despite his still weakened condition, Eddie asks Dennison and Morganti to take him to court to testify. As he confesses to the crime, he inadvertently reveals to everyone that he is Mrs. Hoyle's son. The charges against Mrs. Hoyle are dismissed, but Eddie faces several years in prison. Now reunited with her son, Mrs. Hoyle assures him that after prison he can start a new life.

Cast 
Spring Byington as Mrs. Harriet Hoyle
Anthony Caruso as Morganti
Tanis Chandler as Angela Brown
Brett King as Eddie Slattery
Stephen Chase as Judge Guthrie 
Robert Karnes as Harry 'Chip' Rogan
James Flavin as Prosecuting Attorney
Paul Bryar as Willie
Tris Coffin as Pat Dennison
Charles Williams as Charlie
Harry Lauter as Gordon Warren
Michael Whalen as Rev. Haverford
Leander de Cordova as Pastor J. Berland 
Wilbur Mack as Mr. Russ
Don C. Harvey as Detective 
Rory Mallinson as Detective
Frank Jaquet as Watchman
Marcelle Imhof as Court Clerk
Baron James Lichter as Bailiff
Joey Ray as Policeman in Hospital
Ted Stanhope as Clerk of Court

References

External links
 

1951 films
1950s English-language films
American crime films
1951 crime films
Monogram Pictures films
Films directed by Jean Yarbrough
American black-and-white films
1950s American films